Historic site of Seongjusa temple (in Hangul:성주사지, in Hanja:聖住寺址) is no.307 South Korean historic site in Boryeong City, South Chungcheong Province built in Baekje era. However, Stele accompanying pagoda of Buddhist priest Nanghyehwasang still remains including pieces of Buddhist statue of Baekje and several roof tiles in the era of Unified Silla. The stele is registered as the national treasure of South Korea in the present time. The pagoda cherished the most fabulous architectural style with magnificent scale during Unified Silla.

The temple gained its historical fame given that the relics around all the era have been found until now from 7th century to Joseon Dynasty, which enables researchers the difference of designs of roof tiles and statue of Buddhism. The site itself was designated as historic relic with 1 national treasures, 2 treasure-level pagodas. From the excavation project, the site of original place was uncovered. For example, northwestern part of the site appeared to have had the pavilion including remaining monument.

Gallery

See also
 National Treasures of South Korea
 Boryeong Mud Festival

References

600 establishments
Religious organizations established in the 7th century
Baekje
Boryeong
National Treasures of South Korea
Tourist attractions in South Chungcheong Province